Cebu, officially the Province of Cebu, is a province of the Philippines located in the Central Visayas  region, and consists of a main island and 167 surrounding islands and islets. Its capital and largest city is Cebu City, nicknamed "the Queen City of the South", the oldest city and first capital of the Philippines, which is politically independent from the provincial government.

The Cebu Metropolitan Area or Metro Cebu is the second largest metropolitan area in the Philippines (after Metro Manila) with Cebu City as the main center of commerce, trade, education and industry in the Visayas. Being one of the most developed provinces in the Philippines, in a decade it has transformed into a global hub for business processing services, tourism, shipping, furniture-making, and heavy industry. Mactan–Cebu International Airport, located on Mactan Island, is the second busiest airport in the Philippines.

History

Early history 

It was originally applied to the harbors of the town of Sugbu, the ancient name for Cebu City. Alternate renditions of the name by traders between the 13th to 16th centuries include Sebu, Sibuy, Zubu, or Zebu, among others. Sugbu or Sugbo, in turn, is derived from the Old Cebuano term for "scorched earth" or "great fire".

The Rajahnate of Cebu was a native kingdom which existed in Cebu prior to the arrival of the Spaniards. It was founded by Sri Lumay otherwise known as Rajamuda Lumaya, a half-Malay, half-Tamil prince of the Chola dynasty who invaded Sumatra in Indonesia. He was sent by the Maharajah to establish a base for expeditionary forces to subdue the local kingdoms, but he rebelled and established his own independent Rajahnate instead. The capital of the nation was Singhapala (சிங்கப்பூர்) which is Tamil-Sanskrit for "Lion City", the same rootwords with the modern city-state of Singapore. The later Spanish chronicler Antonio Pigafetta mispronounced Singhapala as Cingopola instead.

Spanish colonial period 
The arrival of Portuguese explorer Ferdinand Magellan in 1521 began a period of Spanish exploration and colonization.

Losing the favour of King Manuel I of Portugal for his plan of reaching the Spice Islands by sailing west from Europe, Magellan offered his services to King Charles I of Spain (Charles V, Holy Roman Emperor). On September 20, 1519, Magellan led five ships with a total complement of 250 people from the Spanish fort of Sanlúcar de Barrameda en route to southeast Asia via the Americas and the Pacific Ocean. They reached the Philippines on March 16, 1521. Rajah Kolambu the king of Mazaua told them to sail for Cebu, where they could trade and obtain provisions.

Arriving in Cebu City, Magellan, with Enrique of Malacca as a translator, befriended Rajah Humabon the Rajah or King of Cebu, and persuaded the natives to ally themselves with Charles I of Spain. Humabon and his wife were given Christian names and baptized as Carlos and Juana. The Santo Niño was presented to the native queen of Cebu, as a symbol of peace and friendship between the Spaniards and the Cebuanos. On April 14 Magellan erected a large wooden cross on the shores of Cebu. Afterwards, about 700 islanders were baptized.

Magellan soon heard of Datu Lapu-Lapu, a native king in nearby Mactan Island, a rival of the Rajahs of Cebu. It was thought that Humabon and Lapu–Lapu had been fighting for control of the flourishing trade in the area. On April 27 the Battle of Mactan occurred, where the Spaniards were defeated and Magellan was killed by the natives of Mactan in Mactan Island. According to Italian historian and chronicler Antonio Pigafetta, Magellan's body was never recovered despite efforts to trade for it with spice and jewels. Magellan's second-in-command, Juan Sebastián Elcano, took his place as captain of the expedition and sailed the fleet back to Spain, circumnavigating the world.

Survivors of the Magellan expedition returned to Spain with tales of a savage island in the East Indies. Consequently, several Spanish expeditions were sent to the islands but all ended in failure. In 1564, Spanish explorers led by Miguel López de Legazpi, sailing from Mexico, arrived in 1565, and established a colony. The Spaniards fought the King, Rajah Tupas, and occupied his territories. The Spaniards established settlements, trade flourished and renamed the island to "Villa del Santísimo Nombre de Jesús" (Town of the Most Holy Name of Jesus). Cebu became the first European settlement established by the Spanish Cortes in the Philippines. In 1595, the Universidad de San Carlos was established and in 1860, Cebu opened its ports to foreign trade. The first printing house (Imprenta de Escondrillas y Cia) was established in 1873 and in 1880, the Colegio de la Inmaculada Concepcion (College of the Immaculate Conception) was established and the first periodical The Bulletin of Cebu ("El Boletin de Cebú") began publishing in 1886.

American colonial period 
In 1898, the island was ceded to the United States after the Spanish–American War and Philippine–American War. In 1901, Cebu was governed by the United States for a brief period, however, it became a charter province on February 24, 1937, and was governed independently by Filipino politicians.

World War II 
Cebu, being one of the most densely populated islands in the Philippines, served as a Japanese base during their occupation in World War II which began with the landing of Japanese soldiers in April 1942. The 3rd, 8th, 82nd and 85th Infantry Division of the Philippine Commonwealth Army was re-established from January 3, 1942, to June 30, 1946, and the 8th Constabulary Regiment of the Philippine Constabulary was reestablished again from October 28, 1944, to June 30, 1946, at the military general headquarters and the military camps and garrisoned in Cebu city and Cebu province. They started the Anti-Japanese military operations in Cebu from April 1942 to September 1945 and helped Cebuano guerrillas and fought against the Japanese Imperial forces. Almost three years later in March 1945, combined Filipino and American forces landed and reoccupied the island during the liberation of the Philippines. Cebuano guerrilla groups led by an American, James M. Cushing, is credited for the establishment of the "Koga Papers", which is said to have changed the American plans to retake the Philippines from Japanese occupation in 1944, by helping the combined United States and the Philippine Commonwealth Army forces enter Cebu in 1945. The following year the island achieved independence from colonial rule in 1946.

During the Marcos dictatorship 
Cebu became a key center of resistance against the Marcos dictatorship, first becoming apparent when the hastily put-together lineup of Pusyon Bisaya defeated the entire slate of Marcos' Kilusang Bagong Lipunan (KBL) in Region VII.

Among the Cebuanos immediately arrested by the Marcos dictatorship when Martial law was announced on September 23, 1972, were columnist and future National Artist Resil Mojares and human rights lawyer and Carcar Vice Mayor Democrito Barcenas, who were both detained at Camp Sergio Osmeña.

One of the Marcos Martial Law Desaparecidos from Cebu was Redemptorist Priest Fr. Rudy Romano, a prominent Marcos critic and Executive Secretary of Cebu's Coalition against People's Persecution, who was accosted by armed men in Tisa, Labangon, Cebu City on June 11, 1985, and never seen again. Levi Ybañez, Romano's colleague in the Coalition against People's Persecution, was abducted on the same day as Fr. Romano, and was also never heard from again.  Ribomapil Holganza, a prominent leader of Cebu's opposition was also arrested together with his son on Christmas Day, December 25, 1983, on political charges.  He was subsequently released and cleared of all charges.

Role in the People Power revolution 
Later, Cebu would play a key role in the days leading up to the 1986 People Power revolution and the ouster of Marcos. It was from Fuente Osmeña circle in Cebu City that the opposition forces relaunched Civil Disobedience Campaign against the Marcos regime and its cronies on February 22, 1986. After that, the Carmelite Monastery in Barangay Mabolo, Cebu City, served as a refuge for opposition candidates Aquino and Laurel during the first day of the People Power revolution, because it was not yet safe to go back to Manila.

Recent history 
In February 2012 Cebu island experienced the effects of magnitude 6.7 earthquake on the neighboring island of Negros and was the largest quake in the area for 90 years. The tremor shook buildings but there were no reports of major building damage or loss of life on Cebu Island itself. This tremor was caused by a previously unrecorded fault.

In October 2013, Cebu and Bohol were hit by record-setting 7.2 magnitude earthquake which left more than 100 dead and collapsed some buildings, including 5 historical churches. There were over 700 aftershocks. The northern part of the province was devastated by Typhoon Haiyan a month later.

In December 2021, Typhoon Rai wreaked havoc across the province, leading to a disaster declaration by the governor.

Geography

Cebu is located to the east of Negros, to the west of Leyte and Bohol islands. The province consists of Cebu Island, as well as 167 smaller islands, which include Mactan, Bantayan, Malapascua, Olango and the Camotes Islands. But the highly urbanized cities of Cebu, Lapu-Lapu and Mandaue are independent cities not under provincial supervision, yet are often grouped with the province for geographical and statistical purposes.

Cebu's central location, proximity to an unusually exotic tourist destination, ready access to a diversity of plant, animal and geological wonders within the island, and remoteness from earthquake and typhoon activity are some of the special attributes of Cebu.

Cebu Island
Cebu Island is the 126th largest island in the world. It has narrow coastlines, limestone plateaus, and coastal plains. It also has rolling hills and rugged mountain ranges traversing the northern and southern lengths of the island.

Flat tracts of land can be found in the city of Bogo and in the towns of San Remigio, Medellin and Daanbantayan at the northern region of the province.

It supports over 4.4 million people, of which 2.5 million live in Metro Cebu.

Beaches, coral atolls, islands, and rich fishing grounds surround Cebu.

Coal was first discovered in Cebu about 1837. There were 15 localities over the whole island, on both coasts; some desultory mining had been carried out Naga near Mount Uling, but most serious operations were at Licos and Camansi west of Compostela and Danao. Active work ceased about 1895 with insurrections, and no production worked for more than ten years. A topographic and geologic survey of Compostela, Danao, and Carmen took place in 1906. The Compostela-Danao coalfield contained about six million workable tons. The tramroads, one from Danao to Camansi, one from Compostela to Mount Licos, were undertaken in 1895, together with a wagon road built in 1877, from Cotcot to Dapdap.

Climate

The climate of Cebu is tropical. There are 2 seasons in Cebu − the dry and wet season. It is dry and sunny most of the year with some occasional rains during the months of June to December. The province of Cebu normally gets typhoons once a year or none.

Northern Cebu gets more rainfall and typhoons than southern Cebu because it has a different climate. Typhoon Haiyan (Yolanda) hit Northern Cebu in 2013 killing 73 people and injuring 348 others. Though most typhoons hit only the northern part of Cebu, the urban areas in central Cebu are sometimes hit, such as when Typhoon Mike (Ruping), one of the worst to hit Cebu lashed the central Cebu area in 1990. 31 years later, Typhoon Rai struck the central and southern portions of the province.

Cebu averages 70–80% humidity.

Flora
Cebu has little remaining forest cover. The remaining forest patches in Cebu are composed primarily of the following tree species.

Mount Lantoy: Carallia brachiata and introduced species Tectona grandis, Swietenia macrophylla, Gmelina arborea, and Casuarina equisetifolia
Palinipinon Mountains: Carallia brachiata and introduced species Swietenia macrophylla
Nug-as forest: Ficus spp., Artocarpus blancoi, Macarang grandifolia, and Cinnamomum cebuense
Mount Lanaya: Carallia brachiata
Mount Tabunan: Trevesia burckii, Voacanga globosa, Schefflera actinophylla, Pouteria villamilii, and Palaquium luzoniense

Fauna

Endemic species in Cebu include the Cebu Flowerpecker (Dicaeum quadricolor), Cebu Slender Skink (Brachymeles cebuensis), and Black Shama (Copsychus cebuensis).

Administrative divisions

The province of Cebu has 3 independent cities (Cebu, Lapu-Lapu, and Mandaue) that are not under provincial supervision but are grouped with the province for geographical and statistical purposes, 6 component cities (Bogo, Carcar, Danao, Naga, Talisay, and Toledo), and 44 municipalities for a total of 53 units as  listed below:

Demographics

When the independent cities – Cebu City (922,611), Lapu-Lapu (408,112), and Mandaue (362,654) – are included for geographical purposes, the total population is 4,632,359 people, with a population density of 870 inhabitants per square kilometre (2,300/sq mi).

The population of the Central Visayas is predominantly young with about 37 percent of its population below 10 years old. This is very evident in the very broad base of the population pyramid in the region which has prevailed since 1970 but at a declining rate. A decline of 2.29 percentage points in the proportion of household population below 15 years old was noted from 1980 to 1995. Conversely, an increase of 3.06 percentage points was observed in the 15–64 age group during the same period. The population of the region is evenly distributed between males and females. However, the male population in the region has been increasing at a faster rate compared to the female population.

In 2010, the median age of the population of the province was 23.0 years, which means that half of the population was younger than 23.0  This is higher than the median age of 20.8 years that was recorded in 2000.

Languages

The Cebuano language is spoken in Cebu, which is also spoken in the rest of Central Visayas and most parts of Eastern Visayas, as well as most provinces of Mindanao.

In the Camotes Islands, especially in Poro, people there speak their own Visayan language called Porohanon, which has Masbateño and Waray-Waray influences. Some of the residents in Bantayan islands also speak Bantayanon, a Visayan language related to Waray-Waray.

Religion

The majority of its population are Roman Catholic followed by roughly 95% of Cebuanos . There are also followers of Iglesia Filipina Independiente, Islam, Buddhism and Hinduism.

Cebu is the capital of the Catholic faith by virtue of being the first Christian city, the first capital of the Spanish East Indies, and the birthplace of Christianity and the Philippine Church. Pope John Paul II, in his Homily for Families in Cebu (February 19, 1981), called the island as the birthplace of Christianity in the Philippines.

The image of Santo Niño de Cebú (Holy Child of Cebu), the oldest Christian image in the Philippines, is enshrined and venerated at the Basilica of Santo Niño. According to Philippine historical documents, the statue of the Santo Niño (Holy Child) was given to the wife of the Rajah of Cebu by the Portuguese explorer Ferdinand Magellan. The friendship is depicted in Cebu's cultural event, the Sinulog where street parades and loud drum beats preceded by a Christian Mass is celebrated every third Sunday of January. Cebu has a Roman Catholic Archdiocese and has several major churches, including the Basilica Minor del Santo Niño de Cebu, Cebu Metropolitan Cathedral, Santo Rosario Parish Church, San José–Recoletos Church, Sacred Heart Church, Archdiocesan Shrine of Our Lady of Lourdes, National Shrine of Our Lady of the Rule, National Shrine of Saint Joseph, Archdiocesan Shrine of Our Lady of Guadalupe of Cebu, San Nicolas de Tolentino Church, and other Christian churches, as well as several other non-Catholic churches, mosques and temples.

Government

 Governor: Gwendolyn Garcia (PDP–Laban/One Cebu/HNP)
 Vice Governor: Hilario P. Davide III (LP/BAKUD)

Congress

Economy

"Ceboom", a combination of Cebu and boom, has been used to describe the province's economic development. With many beautiful islands, white sand beaches, luxury hotels and resorts, diving locations and heritage sites, high domestic and foreign tourist arrivals have fueled the tourism industry of Cebu. Cebu consistently gets a big share of tourist arrivals in the Philippines and has become the tourist gateway to Central and Southern Philippines due to its central geographic location, accessibility, and natural resources. The province also hosts various national and international conferences every year.

About 80% of domestic and international shipping operators and shipbuilders in the Philippines are located in Cebu. Cebu's industry helps make the Philippines the 5th largest shipbuilding country in the world.

Cebu's extensive port facilities and its proximity to intra-Asian shipping and air routes are major factors which led multinational companies to establish offices or factories on the main island, as well as in the island of Mactan, where they are clustered in special economic zones known as the Mactan Economic Processing Zone 1 (MEPZ-1) and the Mactan Economic Processing Zone 2 (MEPZ-2). Due to its burgeoning furniture-making industry, Cebu has been named as the furniture capital of the Philippines. Cebu's other exports include: fashion accessories, guitars, coconut, coconut oil, dried mangoes, carrageenan, gifts, toys, watches, cameras, electronic components, and housewares.

With a revenue growth rate of 18.8 percent in 2012, the real estate industry is the fastest-growing sector in Cebu. With the strong economic indicators and high investors' confidence level, more condominium projects and hypermarkets are being developed in the locality. An additional 100 commercial and residential buildings would be completed by 2015 and another 170 to 200 buildings are expected to be finished by 2017. 64 new hypermarkets will be developed in Cebu.

In 2013, Cebu ranked 8th worldwide in the "Top 100 BPO Destinations Report" by global advisory firm, Tholons. The Cebu Chamber of Commerce and Industry, an organization of Cebu's businesses, is promoting the city's growth and economy on information and communications technology, with the aim of making Cebu the premier ICT, software and e-services investment destination in southeast Asia. Data gathered by the National Economic Development Authority (Neda) 7 showed that of the 98 BPO and IT companies operating in Cebu, 32 offer voice operations while 66 companies offer non-voice operations. Of the 95,000 employed by the industry, more than half or 50,000 are in the non-voice sector. In 2012, the growth in IT-BPO revenues in Cebu grew 26.9 percent at $484 million, while nationally, the industry grew 18.2 percent at $13 billion.

Cebu's economy is also driven by the mining and quarrying areas in Toledo, Naga, Alcoy, and Danao.

Cebu even boasts being a subsidiary of one of the leading ice rink manufacturers in the world. These rinks are engineered and fabricated in Cebu by Ice Rink Supply and shipped worldwide  and Freeze Point Rink Services.

Tourism is an important industry for the province. In 2019, Cebu welcomed 1.4 million foreign tourists, and is one of the most visited in the country by both domestic and foreign visitors. Cebu Island has also entered the list of Condé Nast Traveler's World's Best Islands rankings thrice: 2016, 2017 and 2019. Cebu City and Cebu Province, despite being administratively separated from each other, are often marketed as a single tourist destination, combining natural countryside scenery with urban attractions including cultural-historical sites and developing infrastructure.

Infrastructure

Mactan–Cebu International Airport (MCIA) on the island of Mactan serves as the main gateway to domestic and international routes to or from Cebu City and other islands in the Visayas region. In the last 15 years, MCIA's passenger traffic has grown at an annual average of 21% for international passenger traffic. The airport is the second busiest airport in the Philippines in passenger and cargo traffic. The plan for a new terminal expansion of the airport is underway and estimated to cost $240 million under a public-private partnership program of the Philippine government. The new terminal will host international flights while the old terminal will host domestic flights.

In addition, MCIA Authority (MCIAA) General Manager Nigel Paul Villarete also proposed to establish a Bus Rapid Transit (BRT) line to transport airport passengers to and from MCIAA and different parts of Cebu. This will be integrated into the proposed Bus Rapid Transit (BRT) System being planned in Metro Cebu.

The Port of Cebu is the largest shipping hub in the Visayas region.

Cebu Pacific Air is an airline owned by Cebu-based Gokongwei family. On May 28, 2008, Cebu Pacific was named as the world's number one airline in terms of growth. The airline carried a total of almost 5.5 million passengers in 2007, up 57.4% from 2006. On January 6, 2011, Cebu Pacific flew its 50 millionth passenger (from Manila to Beijing). The airline reached the 100 million passengers in 2015. Cebu Pacific commenced international long-haul flights to Middle East and Australia, flight to Guam starting Q1 2016.

Notable business districts are the Cebu Business Park and the Cebu IT Park. This area hosts industries related to the information technology industry such as software development, telecommunications, engineering research and development centers, and business process outsourcing. In 2013, Ayala Corporation's affiliate, Ayala Land Inc., announced that it is looking at introducing another business park development within the Cebu City area to optimize the high performance of real estate investments in Cebu.

The city's  reclamation forms South Road Properties – a mixed-use development south of the city which features entertainment, leisure, residential and business-processing industries. Is the site of SM Seaside City Cebu, the eighth largest mall in the world (and 3rd largest shopping mall in the Philippines), Filinvest's Citta di Mare and Il Corso,
and the University of the Philippines – Cebu campus.

In Mactan Island, Megaworld Corporation's Mactan Newtown is a 25-hectare business park near Shangri-La's Mactan Resort and Spa. The project will be home to high-tech offices, a retail center, residential towers and villages, leisure facilities with a beach resort frontage.

Mactan Island is linked to mainland Cebu via Mactan-Mandaue Bridge and Marcelo Fernan Bridge.

Media

Cebu is home to a local television station, Cebu Catholic Television Network (CCTN).

Despite having their own local stations, Cebuanos prefer to watch the Philippines's several dominant television networks, namely: ABS-CBN, People's Television Network, IBC, TV5, CNN Philippines and GMA Network.

While national newspapers have a presence on the island, Cebu has English-language local newspapers – The Freeman (under the Star Group), SunStar Cebu and Cebu Daily News (under the Inquirer Group): and Cebuano-language newspapers – SunStar SuperBalita owned by SunStar, and Banat News owned by The Freeman. Each of the local newspapers sell cheaper than their national counterparts.

Education

The Philippine elementary school begins from Grades 1 to 6. The high school program takes six years, from Grades 7 through to 12, taken after graduating from elementary school. Cebu is considered as the main education hub in the Visayas. It has eleven large universities each with a number of college branches mostly throughout the capital, Cebu City, and more than a dozen other schools and universities specializing in various courses such as Medicine, Engineering, Nautical courses, Nursing, Law, Commerce, Education, Computer and IT and other professions.

The most prominent of these universities are (in alphabetical order):
Cebu Doctors University
Cebu Institute of Technology–University
Cebu Normal University
Cebu Technological University
Southwestern University
University of Cebu
University of San Carlos
University of San Jose–Recoletos
University of Southern Philippines Foundation
University of the Philippines Cebu
University of the Visayas
UV Gullas College of Medicine

Other notable institutions include: Asian College of Technology in Cebu City and Talisay, Benedicto College, Cebu Eastern College, Cebu Institute of Medicine, a medical school in affiliation with Velez College, The International Academy of Film and Television, established in Mactan in 2004 and Cebu's first film school, Matias H. Aznar Memorial College of Medicine,  Salazar Colleges of Science and Institute of Technology, among others.

Cebu is home to one fully accredited international school, Cebu International School, a K–12 school established in 1924.
Cebu is considered to be a hub of medical education, with many international students coming to study medicine in Cebu's medical schools. Some of Cebu's well-known medical schools are in Cebu Doctors University and Cebu Institute of Medicine.

Tourism

Attractions

Cebu City is a significant cultural centre in the Philippines. The imprint of Spanish and Roman Catholic culture is evident. There are also many historically important sights all over the province.

Cuisine

Cebu also has a great number of delicacies from every town. Much of the delicacies are either Precolonial or influenced by Spanish or Chinese cuisines.

Festivals
Sinulog

 

The Sinulog Festival is the largest fiesta (festival) in the Philippines. Held every third Sunday of January, it commemorates the Child Jesus (Santo Niño), the Lord and Protector of Cebu. The Sinulog is a dance ritual of pre-Hispanic indigenous origin. The dancer moves two steps forward and one step backward to the rhythmic sound of drums. This movement resembles the current (sulog) of what was then known as Cebu's Pahina River. Thus the name Sinulog.

The Sinulog Festival celebration lasts for nine days, culminating on the final day with the Sinulog Grand Parade. The day before the parade, the Fluvial Procession is held at dawn with a statue of the Santo Niño carried on a pump boat from Mandaue City to Cebu City, decked with hundreds of flowers and candles. The procession ends at the Basilica where a re-enactment of the Christianization of the Philippines on the island of Cebu is performed. In the afternoon, a more solemn procession takes place along the major streets of the city, which last for hours due to large crowds participating in the event.

When the Spaniards arrived in Cebu, the Italian chronicler, Antonio Pigafetta, sailing under convoy with the Magellan expedition, offered the wooden figure of the Santo Niño as a baptismal gift to Hara Amihan, wife of Rajah Humabon who was named Juana after her baptism together with the Rajah, who was also renamed, Carlos. Juana, together with the natives, according to tradition, danced and worshipped the Santo Niño de Cebu in their indigenous Sinulog dance ritual. According to legend, the Rajah's adviser, Baladhay, had fallen ill and was bedridden. The Rajah ordered his men to place Baladhay before the image of Santo Niño hoping that the Holy Child would heal him. The next day, the whole Kingdom of Sugbo was awoken to an angry Baladhay who was threatening the Child with a grass knife, appearing to have also fully recovered from his illness. When the Rajah asked him why he was threatening the Child, he told the Rajah that the Child Jesus had mischievously woken him up with a coconut midrib. Irritated by the Child, he grabbed his knife and threatened the Child by swaying the grass knife at the Child, but the Child simply evaded the knife by dancing. Because the Child was so swift at evading the knife, he had no choice but to dance with the Child as well to keep up his pace. He also explained that the Child's dance resembled the river current. Baladhay is believed to be the first person to dance the Sinulog. The Sinulog ritual was preserved after the Spaniards colonized the Philippines, with the focus still on the worship to the Santo Niño. Once the Santo Niño church was built in the 16th century, the Catholic Malay people started performing the Sinulog ritual in front of the church, the devotees offering candles and indigenous dancers shouting "Viva Pit Señor!", which means to "Trust in the Lord".

In the province, the festival is shared by both Cebu City and Carmen. The festival is said to have originated in Carmen and was once a localized version of the Ati-atihan Festival introduced by Jose Motos, the then rector of the Parish of St. Augustine, the town parish of Carmen, but was then changed to "Sinulog sa Carmen" after Sinulog became an established Cebuano festival. The Sinulog dance was first introduced to Cebu City by a woman named Estelita Diola, who would otherwise be referred to as "Titang Diola". Her family was skilled with the original form of the dance of Sinulog and the tradition was eventually passed on to her by her father.  Because of her great contribution and propagation of the Sinulog dance of Cebu, she was referred to as the "Heritage Keeper". The original Sinulog dance and her legacy of devotion to the Child Jesus through dancing continues today even after her death and is still continued through her former students who now teach the youth of Cebu the original dance moves of Sinulog. Sinulog had since very much diversified from the original dance of Titang Diola. Today we can see the Sinulog danced every day at the Basilica Minore del Santo Niño performed by the candle vendors. The version they perform is called "Sinug" and is only for worship and prayer to bless the candles for prayers to the Holy Child. The Sinulog Festival dance performed by contingents in the City Sports Center is still religious and devotional since dancers often include personal supplications, petitions, thanksgivings, intercessions, or any other prayers in their dance for the Child Jesus and their dance performances in street dance and ritual showdown are still centered on the Holy Child. There are mainly two types of Sinulog dances performed in the festival, namely the "Sinulog-Based Category" and the "Free Interpretation Category". The Sinulog-Based Category refers to the Sinulog dance based on the Church Sinulog performed by candle vendors while the Free Interpretation Category refers to the Sinulog dance interpreted in any way, outside Church Sinulog, for as long as it is acceptable in the festival. In recent years, the festival gained commercialization which made the festival and Cebu popular, but unfortunately lessened the religious nature of the festival. Despite the extreme commercialization of the festival, Sinulog still remains to be a religious festival for the faithful. Sinulog still remains to be a dance of prayer. Much of the participants of the festival are devotees, themselves, of the Santo Niño and often attach their own personal prayers in their dances as either a petition, a thanksgiving, or just an offering.

In the 1980s and 2000s, the city authorities of Cebu added the religious feast of Santo Niño de Cebu during the Sinulog Festival to its cultural event. Despite being a religious festival and a Christian festival, Sinulog has come to be a celebration for all Cebuanos and Filipinos regardless of their faith and practices. Aside from its religious nature, Sinulog has also become renowned for its street parties. In 2012, Cebu introduced Life Dance, the biggest outdoor dance party in the Philippines. The Sinulog street parties are considered a major attraction for youth individuals but, in most cases for most people, particularly the faithful, a growing problem that threatens the religiosity and solemnity of the festival. In 2016, the festival had the worst recorded case of a stampede wherein large groups of people, both worshippers and drunken party-goers, were congested in the uptown area, with no passable exit routes and virtually no crowd control up until midnight and with one recorded case of a teenage woman losing consciousness because of cramped spaces. Due to this incident, the then Cebu City Mayor Tomas Osmeña enforced a strict liquor ban in the following festivals during his term to ensure the safety of the worshippers and spectators and to maintain the solemnity of the celebration.

Kadaugan sa Mactan

Literally translates to the "Victory in Mactan", this is a historical festival reenactment of the Battle of Mactan. Celebrated canonically on April 27, It depicts the events before, during, and immediately after the defeat of Portuguese Navigator Ferdinand Magellan at the hands of Lapu-lapu and his men. Much of the historical activities take place in Mactan Shrine, the site of the Battle of Mactan. Usually, in the Kadaugan sa Mactan, Filipino celebrities, especially celebrities of Cebuano origin, are chosen to portray the key characters of the events of the Battle of Mactan (specifically Lapu-lapu, his wife Reyna Bulakna, and Magellan). This is typically a week-long celebration and culminates with the Rampada Festival, a stylized contemporary reenactment of the victory celebration after the battle in Mactan, incorporating Latin and ballroom dances and steps. Despite the Sinulog Festival being more popular by comparison, the Kadaugan had already been established as a festival of Cebu and its culture and history long before Sinulog was an established festival.

Pasigarbo sa Sugbo

Literally translates to the "Celebration in Cebu", this Festival is a relatively new festival in Cebu, conceptualized in 2008. This festival was the "Brainchild" of Cebu's first female governor, Gwendolyn Garcia. This festival was a program and a major tourism endeavor initiated by the governor in order to promote Cebu as an entire province and to celebrate Cebu in its culture, faith, history, and continuous advancement. In this festival, each individual town in Cebu is encouraged to showcase a theme, a product, a festival, or something unique from their place. Despite, in itself, not being a religious festival, praise, thanksgiving, and worship to God, as well as devotion to the patron saints of each town of Cebu is also given emphasis in the festival (as hinted in the category for portable processional platforms for patron saints or Best in Andas category). Unlike the Sinulog Festival, which is limited to two major categories (Sinulog-based and Free Interpretation), Participants of Pasigarbo are given more freedom in the interpretation of the culture, faith, history, and products of their hometowns. Ever since its conception, the festival had been celebrated yearly at the Cebu International Convention Center (CICC) in Mandaue, around the date of the Provincial Charter Day of Cebu which is celebrated every August 6, however, was ceased after 2012. This was largely due to the 2013 Bohol earthquake, which also heavily affected Cebu, as well as the lack of support from the provincial government for both the repair of the CICC and the festival itself. This was mainly because Garcia was no longer in position as governor at the time. Fortunately, the festival was recently relaunched in 2019, less than a month after Garcia's return to the provincial seat. Unlike previous celebrations, the 2019 Pasigarbo, due to the abandoned state of the CICC, was celebrated, much like the Sinulog Festival, in the Cebu City Sports Complex. As per its return, it has established itself once more as a provincial festival and a new addition to Cebu's prime festivals and significant dates, together with the Sinulog Festival and the Kadaugan sa Mactan.

Other Festivals
Panagtagbo sa Mandaue

This is a religious festival from Mandaue City that is in honor of the Holy Family and is greatly inspired from and is associated directly with the religious activities of the Sinulog Festival. The name of the festival is the Cebuano term for "gathering". This is because the festival celebrates the Translacion (Transfer of Relic) of the Santo Niño de Cebu and Our Lady of Guadalupe to the Archdiocesan Shrine of St. Joseph, the patron saint of Mandaue. It replaced the Mantawi Festival as the festival of Mandaue. The Festival is celebrated on the Thursday before the Sinulog Festival or the day before the Translacion which marks the start of the Triduum of the "Fiesta Señor" activities.

Sugat Kabanhawan

This is the Easter Festival of Minglanilla. It is held in honor of Jesus Christ as the "Risen Lord". It celebrates the mystery of the Resurrection of Jesus and the traditional belief of the faithful in Christ's apparition to the Blessed Virgin Mary in a private revelation in order to reveal to her that He had risen from the dead and is truly God. The festival's name is taken from the term Sugat (Cebuano) or Salubong (Filipino) which is a traditional practice during Easter Vigils wherein an image of Christ is shown before an image of the Virgin Mary that is covered in a black veil to show her mourning and sadness, which is then lifted by angels, exposing the Virgin Mary with unspeakable joy at the Resurrection of Jesus. The second part of the name is the Cebuano word for "resurrection", which is timely for the religious celebration. The Festival is centered on the life of Jesus, as well as Christian Morals and Values, with both themes being heavily incorporated in the performances of the dancers in the festival. This festival has gained Minglanilla the title as the "Easter Capital of Cebu".

Kabkaban

The Kabkaban Festival is the local religious festival of the City of Carcar in honor of St. Catherine of Alexandria. The festival's name was the old name of Carcar, which was taken from Kabkab ("Kabkaban" for plural), the local term for the Oakleaf Fern (Aglaomorpha quercifolia). The festival celebrates Carcar, as well as the Carcaranon way of life and the town's culture, faith, and musical history. Much of the dance steps used in the Kabkaban dance were taken and inspired directly from the dance moves used in the Sinulog Festival and other Sinulog dance offerings by the Sandiego Family with their company, the "Sandiego Dance Company", headed by Val Sandiego, a native of Carcar who is also considered as the "Father of Kabkaban". The inspiration from the dance company is also evident in the costumes used by the dancers of the Kabkaban Festival, as well as dancers representing Carcar in the Sinulog Festival or other festivals like the Pasigarbo sa Sugbo Festival of Festivals. The Kabkaban festival is celebrated from the 23rd until November 25, in line with the feast day of the town's patron saint.

La Torta
The La Torta Festival is Argao's food festival. It is in honor of St. Michael the Archangel. It replaced Argao's former festival, the "Pitlagong Festival" in 2011. It celebrates the Torta, a Cebuano tart-like cake that is reminiscent of the Spanish cake, but distinct in its recipe as it uses Tubâ or coconut wine as a rising agent instead of yeast. Because Argao is one of Cebu's Spanish Towns (the other being Liloan), dancers in the La Torta Festival wear Spanish inspired costumes that usually have a red motif to them and dance Spanish dance steps or Spanish-inspired dance steps. It is celebrated on September 28 to 29 to coincide with the feast of the archangels.

Dagitab

The Dagitab Festival is Naga's Christmas Festival. It is in honor of St. Francis of Assisi. The name of the festival means "electric light" which is what Naga is known for, particularly during the Holidays. During December, Naga's streets, parks, and buildings are lit with all sorts of bright lights of different colors to mark the Holiday Season. But these bright lights come at a cost, power outages. To resolve this problem, Gov. Gwen Garcia, together with the Province of Cebu, set up another electric company to supply electricity in the town. The onset of electric advancements and greater connection initiated the start of the industrialization of Naga. The industrial movement is also one of the focuses of the festival. Dancers in the Dagitab Festival wear and incorporate LED lights/lamps in their lively performances to bring the Holiday Spirit to everyone and to celebrate the advancement of the city. This festival has gained Naga the titles of being the "Christmas Capital of Cebu" and the "Industrial Hub of the South". Despite being in honor of St. Francis, whose feast day is on October 4, the festival is celebrated on December 23 which is two days before  Christmas Day.

Halad Inasal

The Halad Inasal Festival is Talisay's food festival. It is in honor of St. Teresa of Avila. The name of the festival is taken from the Cebuano words Halad, which means offering, and Inasal, which refers to the local term for Lechon or Philippine Roasted Pig. Cebu is well known for producing Lechon Inasal and has two towns that are dedicated "Lechon Towns" with one being Talisay (the other being Carcar). The festival was formerly called simply the "Inasal Festival", but was renamed as "Halad Inasal Festival" to highlight the religiosity of the festival. In the Halad Inasal Festival, dancers and participants parade freshly roasted and crunchy Inasal in the streets of Talisay while they perform their dance offerings and bring them even while they perform their ritual showdown. It is celebrated around, but never directly on October 15, the feast of St. Teresa, so as not to interfere with the religious activities of the town feast.

Bonga

The Bonga Festival is the Harvest Festival of Sibonga. It is in honor of the town's two patron saints, St. Philomena and Our Lady of the Pillar. The name of the festival is the Cebuano word for "fruit". It is a festival of thanksgiving for the bountiful fruit harvest during the harvest season of the town. It is celebrated on October 12, in line with the feast of the original patroness of the town, the Blessed Virgin. The festival has given the town its very own title as the "Fruit Basket of Cebu".

Rosquillos (Festival)

The Rosquillos festival is the food festival of Liloan. It is in honor of St. Ferdinand of Castille. It celebrates the Rosquillos, a Philippine ring type cookie that originated from Liloan. The cookie was conceptualized and conceived by a woman named Titay Frasco, who was the founder of Titay's, the largest chain company of Rosquillos in the Philippines. It is celebrated on May 30.

Kagasangan

This is the sea festival of Moalboal. It is in honor of St. John of Nepomuk. The name of the festival is taken from the Cebuano term for "coral reefs". It is a nature-tourism project initiated by the local government made to preserve the reefs of the town, which are viable sources of livelihood and eco-tourism. This is one of the known sea festivals in the Province of Cebu. It is celebrated on May 16.

Utanon

The Utanon Festival of Dalaguete, is the town's harvest festival. It is in honor of St. William the Hermit. The name of the festival is the Cebuano word for "vegetables". It is a festival about showing thanksgiving for the bountiful harvest of vegetables in the town, all year round. It is celebrated on February 10. The festival has helped acknowledge the town as a producer of grain and vegetable crops, giving the town the title as the "Salad Bowl of Cebu".

Siloy

The Siloy Festival is Alcoy's nature festival and eco-tourism project. It is in honor of St. Rose of Lima. The festival takes its name from the local term of the Black Shama Bird (Copsychus Cebuensis), a local species of song bird only found in Cebu, with its last stronghold in Alcoy's rainforest and woody areas. The festival is a project meant to promote awareness of the Black Shama and its endangered nature and to help preserve Cebu's endemic Shama species of birds, as well to help save Mother Earth. It is celebrated on August 23 every year.

Palawod

The Palawod Festival is the sea festival of Bantayan. It is in honor of Sts. Peter and Paul, who are both the town's patron saints. The festival's name means "to voyage into deep waters". This is a festival of thanksgiving for the bountiful catch and for the abundance of the sea and its bounty. It is celebrated on the 29th of the month of June to be connected with the Solemnity of Sts. Peter and Paul.

Tostado

The Tostado festival is the food festival of Santander. It is in honor of St. Gabriel the Archangel. It celebrates the Tostado, a Cebuano shortbread cookie that is shaped like a flower. The local economy had been heavily boosted thanks to the Tostado cookie, which had provided job opportunities for many people. This festival also celebrates the resources of the town. It is celebrated on the 3rd Sunday of April.

Isda

This is the sea festival and town fiesta of Madridejos. It is in honor of the Immaculate Conception. The name of the festival is the Cebuano word for "fish". It celebrates the bountiful catch and the abundance of fish species and other marine life in the area. It is celebrated on December 8, which is also the Solemnity of the Immaculate Conception of the Blessed Virgin Mary.

Banig

This is the weaving festival of Badian. It is in honor of St. James the Great. It celebrates the Banig, a hand-woven Philippine mat made from Pandanus leaves that is commonly sold, in the province, in Badian. It is celebrated on the 25th of the month of April.

Hinulawan

This is the town fiesta of Toledo. It is in honor of St. John of Sahagun. The name of this festival is an amalgamation of two Cebuano words, Hinaguan, which means "fruits of labor", and Bulawan, which means "bright" or "golden". This was, historically, the old name of the town. Currently, it is the name of a river that is found in the town. Hinulawan Festival celebrates the rich culture and history of the town, as well as the golden hearts and the shining and welcoming personality of the Toledohanons. It falls on June 12, which coincides with the Philippine Independence Day celebration.

Toslob

Originally called the "Sadsad Festival", this is the local festival of Oslob. Like the Isda Festival, It is in honor of the Immaculate Conception. The name of the festival is the Cebuano term for the act of "dipping". The name of the festival is a reference to the etymology of the name of the town wherein two Spanish soldiers mistakenly identified the town after asking a couple who, due to misinterpretation, thought they were referring to what they were doing. The couple did not understand that the soldiers were asking for the name of the town and simply thought they were referring to the boiled bananas they were dipping in salted vinegar so all they could utter was "Toslob". The soldiers seemingly also misheard them and thought they said "Oslob". Ever since then, the town was referred to by that name which the Spanish Soldiers heard. The Toslob festival is a celebration of thanksgiving for the graces received as a town community. It is celebrated on December 8, which is also the Solemnity of the Immaculate Conception of the Blessed Virgin Mary.

Pamuhuan/Pinamuohan

This is the harvest festival of Pinamungajan. It is in honor of St. Monica. The name of the festival came from the Cebuano word, Pinamuhuan, which means "a worker's share of the harvest". It is a celebration of thanksgiving for the bountiful harvest in the town. It is celebrated on August 27.

Lalin

This is the town fiesta of Asturias. It is in honor of St. Roch. The name of the festival comes from the Cebuano word which refers to the combination of cultures of different people. The festival's name was taken from the old name of the town, which was Naghalin. The town was called "Naghalin" because it was a place where migrants settled and formed a neighborhood. The neighborhood soon flourished into a community and a town of Cebu. This festival is a celebration of thanksgiving for the graces received by the town and the community. It is celebrated on August 16.

Panagsogod

This is the town fiesta of Sogod. It is in honor of St. James the Great. The name of the festival is taken from the Cebuano word for "Beginning" and is a reference to the town being the "place of origin of the North and the South" or "where the North and the South meet". This is because the shoreline of Sogod is composed of half white sand from the North of Cebu and half black sand from the South. It is a celebration of happy endings and new beginnings every year. It is celebrated on the 25th of the month of April.

Sarok (Festival)

The Sarok Festival is the town fiesta of Consolacion. It is in honor of St. Narcissus. It celebrates the Sarok, a Cebuano variant of the Salakot that is made of woven Stalks from the Nito plant (Lygodium Circinnatum) and/or dried leaves or Bamboo, creating a patterned net-like structure, with a signature six-petal flower design made from lighter leaves or thin Bamboo wood plates secured at the very top of the hat. It is celebrated every February 14 (coinciding with Valentines Day), in commemoration of Consolacion's Founding Anniversary.

Tagbo

This festival is the town fiesta of Poro. The festival is patterned after Sinulog and is also in honor of the Santo Niño. The name of the festival is the Cebuano word for the act of "meeting", or "to meet". This is taken from the history of the town of Poro, wherein two warring tribes met together on one spot to make a community, eventually forming the town of Poro. It is celebrated on January 19.

Tubod

This is the town fiesta of Tuburan. It is in honor of St. Anthony of Padua. The name of the festival is the Cebuano word for "Spring". It celebrates the 7 springs of Tuburan, which are said to be the tears of fairies who continue to cry today, yearning and waiting for their lovers to return. The springs have become the main tourist attractions of Tuburan and have placed the town on the map. It is celebrated on June 13

Katubhan

This is the harvest festival Medellin. It was formerly Medellin's Sinulog Festival, but was changed to its own festival to make it distinct from Sinulog and to focus on the main products of the town, Sugarcane and Sugar. However, it is still in honor of Santo Niño. The name of the festival is taken from the Cebuano term for "sugarcane plantation". It is a festival meant to be a thanksgiving to the Child Jesus for the bountiful harvest of sugarcane all year round. The sugarcane has become so abundant in the town that Medellin has received the title as "The Sugar Bowl of Cebu". It is celebrated every April 27.

Panuhog

This is the sea festival of Santa Fe. It replaced the "Puting Baybay" Festival as the official town fiesta. It was also formerly the Sinulog festival of the town, but was changed to its own distinct festival. Like Sinulog, it is in honor of Santo Niño. The name of the festival is taken from the Cebuano word for "stringing things together". This refers to the act of stringing shells found on the shorelines to form various crafts and ornaments, from chandeliers, to wind chimes, bracelets, keychains, tourism giftshop items, etc. It celebrates the shell craft industry, which is one of the main industries of the town (the others being fishing and beach resort management). It is meant to be a thanksgiving to the Child Jesus for blessing the town with beautiful beaches and bountiful marine life. It is celebrated every October 2.

Lingaw-sadya

This is the town fiesta of Balamban. It is in honor of St. Francis of Assisi. The name of the festival is derived from 2 Cebuano words, namely lingaw, which means "enjoyment", and sadya, which means "happiness". It is a celebration that celebrates Balamban as a center for mountain climbing and merry-making. It is meant to be a celebration of happy moments and all the good times each year. It is celebrated on the October 3 to 4, around the feast of the town's patron saint.

Garbo

This is the town fiesta of Lapu-lapu. It is in honor of Our Lady of the Rule, the Virgin Mary depicted as a Black Madonna. The name of the festival is the Cebuano word for "pride". It is a celebration of all things proudly Oponganon and a thanksgiving to the Blessed Virgin for her intercession and for all graces received every year. It is celebrated around the feast day of the Virgin Mary which is every November 21.

Karansa

This is the pottery festival of Danao. It is in honor of St. Thomas of Villanova. The name of the festival is a Cebuano term that refers to an "expression of joy and happiness among potters after a hard day's work". The festival is primarily a happy and playful dancing and prancing activity in coordination with the rhythm of music, beating of the drums and occasional loud shouts. The dance has four basic steps, namely, swaying (kiay), shaking (karag and kurug) and juddering (karahay). It is celebrated annually every 3rd Sunday of September.

Soli-soli

This is the weaving festival of San Francisco. It is in honor of St. Joseph. The festival's name refers to the local name for the Common Bulrush (Typha latifolia), a plant that is common in the town around Lake Danao and all throughout Pacijan Island. The Festival showcases the livelihood of the San Franciscohanons, which is weaving the Soli-soli grass into mats, decorations, handbags, pouches, and other handicrafts. There are three basic dance steps of the festival dance, namely, hands and arms sideward swaying, harvesting and cutting movement, and finally a weaving motion, which are all a mimesis of the process of weaving Soli-soli. It is celebrated every third Sunday of March, in line with the solemnity of St. Joseph, husband of Mary.

Kinsan

This is the sea festival of Aloguinsan. It is in honor of St. Raphael the Archangel. It celebrates the Dotted Grouper (Epinephelus epistictus), known locally as Kinsan, which is an abundant fish in the town and an important source of livelihood for the town's fishermen. The festival is celebrated through lively dancing in the street and in the grandstand, as well as cooking contests for the best Kinsan dish in town. It is celebrated every 2nd Sunday of June.

Binuyocan/Buyoc

This is the town fiesta of Malabuyoc. It is in honor of St. Nicholas of Tolentino. The name of the festival is derived from the Cebuano buyoc, which means to "bend down" or "bend over. According to a popular story, long ago, Malabuyoc grew plenty of fruit trees such as Mangoes, Lanzones, Cacaos, and many others. The fruit of the tree branches grew so big and plentiful that the trees bent down under their weight. Because of practically all the branches of the fruit trees bending over due to the over-abundance of fruit, the place came to be called "Buyoc", and eventually "Malabuyoc". The municipality of Malabuyoc launched the Binuyocan Festival on September 10, 2004. The festival is a celebration of the bountiful harvest of fruit in the town. It continues to be celebrated every September 10 every year.

Humba (Festival)

The Humba Festival is the food festival of Ronda.
It is in honor of Our Lady of Sorrows. It replaced the Panginabuhi Festival as the official festival of the town. The festival celebrates the Humba dish, a Visayan braised pork dish that is the iconic delicacy of the town. During the Humba festival, dancers incorporate the Humba dish, as well as the ingredients of Humba in their dances. There are also Humba cooking contests to promote Humba and to determine the best Humba every year. It is celebrated around the September 14 or 15, in line with the feast of the Virgin Mary.

Haladaya

This is the historical festival of Daanbantayan. It celebrates Datu Daya, the precolonial chieftain of the kingdom known as "Kandaya", which is now present-day Daanbantayan. The name of the festival is an exaltation to Datu Daya, translating to "all hail Daya". It is meant to be a celebration of the leadership and bravery of Datu Daya. Despite being a historical festival, it is also considered a religious festival in honor of St. Rose of Lima. It is celebrated every August 30, in line with the feast of the town's patron saint.

Bahandi

This is the town fiesta of 
Alcantara. It is in honor of St. Augustine of Hippo. The name of the festival is the Cebuano word for "treasure". It is meant to be a thanksgiving for the treasures of Alcantara, which are its natural resources. It is celebrated on the August 27 to 28 in line with the feast of the patron saint of the town.

Lapyahan

This is the sea festival of San Remigio. It is in honor of St. John of Nepomuk. The name of the festival is taken from the Cebuano term for "shorelines". It is a thanksgiving for the shoreline of the town, which is the longest in the Province of Cebu, as well as the bounty of the sea. It is celebrated on May 16.

Hinatdan

This is the town fiesta of Ginatilan. It is in honor of St. Gregory the Great. The festival's name Hinatdan is the Cebuano term for "getting things done". It is a celebration of the hardwork, faith, and resiliency of the Ginatilanons. It is celebrated around the 2nd week of March.

Dinagat

This is the sea festival of Cordova. It is in honor of St. Roch. The name of the festival is a Cebuano word "gathering from the sea" and is reference to a method of fishing by means of picking sea life from the shoreline for food. The festival celebrates the rich and bountiful sea life of Cordova. Dancers in the Dinagat festival incorporate sea life in their dances, especially moray eels, locally known as Bakasi, which are considered a delicacy in Cordova. This is also why the Dinagat festival is also referred to as the "Dinagat-Bakasi festival". It is celebrated on August 16.

Pintos (Festival)

This is the food festival of Bogo. It celebrates the Pintos, a sweet Philippine tamales that is the main delicacy of Bogo. It is in honor of St. Vincent Ferrer. The festival is a thanksgiving for the Pintos as the town's major source of livelihood and tourism for many people. The Pintos is also incorporated in the dances of the festival. It is celebrated every May 26.

Tuba (Festival)

This is the town fiesta of Borbon. It is in honor of St. Sebastian. It celebrates the Tubâ, a Visayan coconut wine (also called coconut toddy) commonly found in the town. The festival is a thanksgiving for Tuba as a source of livelihood, as well as the local toddy industry. It is celebrated every January 20.

Budbod Kabog

This is the food festival of Catmon. It is in honor of St. William the Hermit. The name of the festival is derived from Budbod, a type of rice cake or grain cake, made with Millet (known locally as Kabog) instead of the usual ingredient, rice. It is a festival about showing thanksgiving for the Budbod industry in the town. It is celebrated on February 10.

Sinanggiyaw

This is the harvest festival of Dumanjug. It is in honor of St. Francis of Assisi. The festival's name is an amalgamation of the words Sanggi, which refers to the process of harvesting crops, and Sayaw, which is Filipino for "Dance". The dance of the festival is a mimesis of the process of farming and harvesting. It is a celebration of thanksgiving for the bountiful harvest in the town. It is celebrated on October 4.

Cassava (Festival)

This is the harvest festival of Tudela. It is in honor of the Immaculate Conception. It is a celebration of thanksgiving for the bountiful harvest of Cassava, the main produce of the town. It is celebrated on the first two weeks of June.

Kawayan

This is the town fiesta of Alegria. It is in honor of St. Francis Xavier. The festival's name is the Cebuano word for "Bamboo". It is a celebration of thanksgiving for the abundance of bamboo in the town and its many uses and applications. It is celebrated annually on December 2–3.

Pausbaw

This is the harvest festival of Tabogon. It is in honor of St. Isidore the Farmer. It replaced the Sanggi Festival as the official festival of the town. The festival's name Pausbaw is the Cebuano term for "achieving progress for farmers with the help of carabaos". The festival is a dedication to the hard work of farmers that plow the field with the help of water buffalos. It is a celebration of thanksgiving for the bountiful harvest of the town. It is celebrated on May 20.

Dagayday

This is the town fiesta of 
Samboan. It is in honor of St. Michael the Archangel. It replaced the Sak-sak Festival as the official festival of the town. The name of the festival is the Cebuano word for "Waterfalls". It is a thanksgiving for the natural resources of the town, which are its waterfalls. It is celebrated on September 28 to 29 to coincide with the feast of the archangels.

Ani-anihan

This is the harvest festival of Tabuelan. It is in honor of St. John the Baptist. The festival's name is a Cebuano term that is a reference to the act of "harvesting". It is a celebration of thanksgiving for the bountiful harvest of the town. It is celebrated on June 24.

Pamugsay

This is the sea festival of Pilar. It is in honor of St. Francis Xavier. The name of the festival is a Cebuano term for "the act of paddling". The festival celebrates the rich and bountiful sea life of Pilar. It is celebrated annually on December 2.

Queseo

This is the food festival of Compostela. It is in honor of St. James the Great. The name of the festival is the Cebuano word for "Carabao White Cheese". There are seven main dance steps in the festival dance. These dance steps are all a mimesis of the process of making the Queseo. The dance steps are Limpyo (cleaning the carabao teat),
Puga sa Gatas (milking the carabao), Sa-an (screening the milk with a mesh), Init kaldero (heating of the cauldron), Huwad suka (pouring vinegar to milk and stirring it in), Hulma (molding the cheese), and finally, Putos (wrapping the cheese with banana leaf strips). It is a celebration of the cheese-making livelihood of the town. It is celebrated on July 25.

Panumod

This is the farm animal festival of Barili. It is in honor of St. Anne. It replaced the Kaumahan Festival as the official festival of the town. The festival's name is a Cebuano term for "livestock". Barili is considered to be the largest producer of livestock in the province. The town's public market, the Mantalongon Public Market is where most of the town's livestock and domestic animals are sold. It is a celebration of thanksgiving for the bountiful livestock of the town. It is celebrated on July 26.

Sikoy-sikoy

This is the sea festival of San Fernando. It is in honor of St. Isidore the Farmer. The name of the festival is a Cebuano word Sikoy, which is a fishing method using nets done during rough tides. The festival celebrates the rich and bountiful sea life of San Fernando, which are considered blessings of God's love to the town. It is celebrated every November 17–21.

Bolho

This is the town fiesta of 
Boljoon. It is in honor of Our Lady of the Patronage. The name of the festival is a reference to the origin of the name of the town which is a Cebuano term referring to a large land mass cavity surrounded by mountains. This valley is believed to have been brought about by the sudden collapse of a mountain range. It is a celebration of the way of life of the Boljo-anons. It is celebrated around November 13, in line with the feast of the Virgin Mary.

International relations and sisterhood agreements

 Cebu Province hosted two major Information and Communications Technology (ICT) and telecom events, the 12th ASEAN Telecommunications and IT Ministers Meeting (TELMIN) and the 13th ASEAN Telecommunications and IT Senior Officials Meeting (TELSOM) in 2012.
 Cebu Province hosted the international 4th Dance Xchange, a project organized by the National Dance Committee of the National Commission for Culture and the Arts in 2012.
 Cebu Province as member hosted the 11th East Asia Inter-Regional Tourism Forum in 2011
 Cebu Province join as a participating member of Inter–Island Tourism Policy Forum in 2011 (ITOP Forum)
 Cebu Province hosted the 12th ASEAN Summit in 2007.

  Sichuan, China (2006)
  Vladimir, Russia (2008)
  Ljubljana, Slovenia (2008)
  Gangwon, South Korea (2008)
  Guam, United States of America (2008)
  Rishon LeZion, Israel (2009)
  Saint Petersburg, Russia (2009)
  Guangdong, China (2009)
  Guangxi, China (2010)
  Barcelona, Spain (2010)
  Autonomous Republic of Crimea, Ukraine (2010)
  Busan, South Korea (2011)
  Ninawa, Iraq (2011)
  Valparaíso, Chile (2011)
  Fujian, People's Republic of China (2018)

Existing sisterhood agreements

  Hainan, China
  Hawaii, United States of America

Domestic sisterhood agreements

 Sorsogon City
 Antique
 Aklan
 Ilocos Norte
 Iloilo
 South Cotabato
 Bukidnon
 Masbate
 Laguna
 Quezon
 Parañaque
 Pangasinan
 Davao del Sur

Notes

References

Bibliography

External links

 
 Official Website of the Provincial Government of Cebu
 The Official Government Portal of the Republic of the Philippines – Cebu

 
Provinces of the Philippines
Provinces of Central Visayas
Island provinces of the Philippines
States and territories established in 1565
1565 establishments in the Philippines